Tantaquidgeon is a Mohegan name and may refer to

People
Gladys Tantaquidgeon (1899–2005), a Mohegan medicine woman
Melissa Tantaquidgeon Zobel (born 1960), a Mohegan historian and storyteller

Other
Tantaquidgeon Indian Museum, a museum of the Mohegans on Mohegan Hill, Uncasville, Connecticut